Turtles have been classified in different ways by different authors. While they were previously considered anapsids, they are now considered more derived. Recent analyses of molecular evidence have strongly suggested that they belong in the clade Archosauromorpha (also known as Archelosauria). Below are many of the possible classifications of Testudines and Testudinata:

Thomson and Shaffer, 2010
Below is a cladogram of living testudines found by Thomson and Shaffer in 2010:

Sterli 2010
Below is a cladogram found by Sterli in 2010 in a phylogenetic analysis of Pleurodira:

Joyce, 2007
Below is a cladogram found by Joyce in 2007 in his publication on turtle phylogeny:

See also 

Wikipedia category tree of Testudines taxonomy

References

Testudines
Turtle taxonomy
Testudinata